A Chicago temple may refer to:

 BAPS Shri Swaminarayan Mandir Chicago, is a Hindu place of worship of the denomination of the Swaminarayan branch of Hinduism. 
 Baháʼí House of Worship (Wilmette, Illinois), in a suburb of Chicago, the second Baháʼí House of Worship ever constructed and the oldest one still standing.
 Buddhist Temple of Chicago, was founded in October 1944 of the Jōdo Shinshū ("True Pure Land School") of Higashi Hongan-ji ("Shin Buddhism") by those that had been released from Japanese-American internment camps.
 Chicago Illinois Temple, the thirty-fifth temple of the Church of Jesus Christ of Latter-day Saints.
 First United Methodist Church of Chicago, a church located at the base and utmost floors of the Chicago Temple Building.
 Masonic Temple (Chicago) which was a skyscraper built in Chicago, Illinois in 1892, and from 1895 to the 1920s the tallest building in Chicago.
 Medinah Temple, built by Shriners architects Huehl and Schmidt on the Near North Side of Chicago, in 1912, as an example of Moorish Revival architecture.

See also :Category:Churches in Chicago, :Category:Synagogues in Chicago, and generally :Category:Religious buildings and structures in Chicago